Ain Prosa (born 7 October 1967 in Räpina) is an Estonian film and theatre director, and actor.

In 1996, he graduated from Estonian Academy of Music and Theatre.

1990–2000, he worked at ETV Teleteater.

Works and roles
 1993 	"Õnne 13" (television series; director)
 1995 	"Wikmani poisid" (television series; Maim's role)
 2006 	"Ohtlik lend" (television series; director)
 2008 	"Tuulepealne maa" (television series; director)
 2009 	"Kättemaksukontor" (television series; director)

References

Living people
1967 births
Estonian film directors
Estonian theatre directors
Estonian male stage actors
Estonian male television actors
Estonian Academy of Music and Theatre alumni
People from Räpina